Penicillium albicans is a fungus species of the genus of Penicillium.

See also
List of Penicillium species

References

Further reading
 

albicans
Fungi described in 1907